The Estadio Jesús Martínez "Palillo" is a multi-use stadium located in the Magdalena Mixhuca Sports City in Mexico City. It is currently the home of the Mexicas of the Liga de Fútbol Americano Profesional (LFA) and Guerreros de Xico of the Serie B de México. The stadium has a capacity of 6,000 seated spectators.

History

The Estadio Municipal (Municipal Stadium) opened in 1964. In 1983, it was named after Mexican actor and comedian Jesús Martínez "Palillo" in recognition of his contributions to the original construction of the Sports City.
The stadium was remodeled in 2014 at a cost of 25 million pesos, its first major maintenance in 15 years.

The track bears an IAAF Class 2 designation, one of three such tracks in Mexico City, allowing it to be used for a variety of international events. Among the international events held at the stadium was the 2018 World Modern Pentathlon Championships, held in Mexico City to mark the 50th anniversary of the Olympic Games.

Uses

1968 Summer Olympics
The Estadio Municipal, as well as two adjoining fields in the Sports City, hosted the  field hockey competitions of the 1968 Summer Olympics. For the Games, the 6,160-seat capacity of the roofed grandstands was augmented by additional temporary stands, with approximately 1,200 seats, installed in the end zones. Rest areas for athletes, dressing rooms, showers and a cafeteria were located in a building adjacent to the stadium. The playing field was conditioned in accordance with the regulations of the International Hockey Federation.

Football
In 2014 it was chosen as the field of the Ángeles de la Ciudad F.C., owned by the Government of Mexico City, until 2016 the team remained in this stadium. In 2020, Atlético Capitalino, that plays in the Liga de Balompié Mexicano, chose it as the venue for its matches after not being able to get the use of the Estadio Ciudad de los Deportes, so soccer became the stadium's main sport. In 2021 the stadium became the field of the teams Leviatán F.C., Guerreros de Xico and C.D. Muxes.

American football
From 2016 to 2018, the stadium was home several teams of the Liga de Fútbol Americano Profesional. Initially, all of the league's Mexico City-based teams, including the Raptors and Mexicas, used the venue until relocating to other sports facilities in the Mexico City area. In the 2018 season, the Raptors were the first Mexico City-based squad to move out when they made the Estadio José Ortega Martínez in Naucalpan, State of Mexico, their home, while the Mexicas announced that they would move to the Estadio Wilfrido Massieu in 2019.

In 2022, Mexicas returned to the "Palillo" Martínez stadium for the 2022 LFA season.

For the 2023 LFA season, the Rojos de la Ciudad de México will play in the stadium.

Non-sports

One of the stages of the annual Vive Latino festival, which is primarily held in the Sports City's Foro Sol, is set up on the field at the stadium.

In late 2018, the stadium was used by Mexico City's government as a shelter for migrants traveling in the late 2018 migrant caravan from Central America. In preparation for the arrival of migrants, the field was covered, kitchen facilities prepared and tanks with a capacity of 10,000 liters of drinking water were put in place. The shelter will have a capacity of 6,500 when all preparations are complete.

References

External links
 Official page of the Estadio Jesús Martínez "Palillo"

Sports venues in Mexico City
Jesús "Palillo" Martínez
Athletics (track and field) venues in Mexico
American football venues in Mexico
Venues of the 1968 Summer Olympics
Olympic field hockey venues